Robert William Harrison (born August 12, 1927) is an American retired professional basketball player. A 6'1" guard from the University of Michigan, Harrison played nine seasons (1949–1958) in the National Basketball Association as a member of the Minneapolis Lakers, Milwaukee Hawks, St. Louis Hawks, and Syracuse Nationals. He averaged 7.2 points per game in his professional career and appeared in the 1956 NBA All-Star Game. Harrison coached the Syracuse Centenials during the 1976–77 Eastern Basketball Association season.

Harrison later coached basketball at Kenyon College and Harvard University.

On February 3, 1941, as a 13-year-old 8th grader in Toledo, Ohio, Harrison scored all 139 points during his LaGrange School team's 139–8 win over Arch Street School. In the game, he made 69 field goals and one free throw.

NBA career statistics

Regular season

Playoffs

See also
 List of basketball players who have scored 100 points in a single game
 University of Michigan Athletic Hall of Honor

References

External links
Career statistics

1927 births
Living people
American men's basketball players
Basketball coaches from Ohio
Basketball players from Ohio
College men's basketball head coaches in the United States
Harvard Crimson men's basketball coaches
Kenyon Lords basketball coaches
Michigan Wolverines men's basketball players
Milwaukee Hawks players
Minneapolis Lakers draft picks
Minneapolis Lakers players
National Basketball Association All-Stars
Point guards
Shooting guards
Sportspeople from Toledo, Ohio
St. Louis Hawks players
Syracuse Nationals players
Eastern Basketball Association coaches